Growl is a 2008 album by Radioactive Man, a pseudonym of Keith Tenniswood. It was his first release in five years as well as the first on his own label, Control Tower.

Track listing
 "Basement Business" (4:09)
 "Pieces of Eight" (6:26)
 "Nothing at All" featuring Dot Allison (4:29)
 "Kristina" (6:11)
 "Double Dealings" featuring Andrew Weatherall (5:57)
 "5-Armed Skeleton" (6:06)
 "Up in the Air" (1:46)
 "Dalston to Detroit" (6:25)
 "Growl" (5:03)
 "State of That" (6:15)
 "Lungfull of Bass" (6:12)

References

Keith Tenniswood albums
2008 albums
Control Tower albums